Blue Plate Specials is a live album by The Specials, released in 1999 (see 1999 in music).  The material on the album is sourced from two separate performances: a 1980 concert by The Specials, and an earlier show when they were still known as either Coventry Automatics or the Special A.K.A.

Track listing
"Gangsters" - 2:32
"Do the Dog" - 2:13
"Stupid Marriage" - 4:33
"Nite Klub" - 3:16
"Too Much Too Young" - 2:02
"Little Bitch" - 2:44
"Skinhead Moonstomp" - 2:42
"Concrete Jungle" - 3:15
"Rock & Roll Nightmare" - 1:59
"Look But Don't Touch" - 4:23
"It's Up to You" - 3:00
"Jay Walker" - 3:10
"(Dawning of A) New Era" - 2:41
"Blank Expression" - 2:07
"Wake Up" - 1:36

Personnel
The Specials
Terry Hall - vocals
Neville Staple - vocals, percussion
Lynval Golding - vocals, rhythm guitar
Roddy Radiation - lead guitar
Sir Horace Gentleman - bass guitar
Jerry Dammers - keyboards
John Bradbury - drums
Technical
Steve Hoffman - mastering
Jeffrey Mayer - photography

1999 live albums
The Specials live albums